Jibril is a 2018 German drama film directed by Henrika Kull. It was screened in the Panorama section at the 68th Berlin International Film Festival.

Cast
 Susanna Abdulmajid as Maryam
 Malik Adan as Jibril

References

External links
 

2018 films
2018 drama films
German drama films
2010s German-language films
2010s German films